Fårö Lighthouse is a Swedish lighthouse located on the easternmost tip of Fårö.

History
In the 19th century there had been many complaints from sea authorities that the coastlines on Gotland had very few lighthouses. So the decision was made to build one on the north side of Gotland. This lighthouse was constructed one year after the one on Hoburgen at the south tip of Gotland.

The light ran on a colza oil lamp at first. In 1882 a paraffin lamp replaced the old one, and in 1953 it was electrified. From 1891 to 1976 the tower had a first-order Fresnel lens installed in its lantern which made the lighthouse very powerful. It is remote-controlled since 1976 and owned by the Swedish Maritime Administration.

See also

 List of lighthouses and lightvessels in Sweden

References

External links
 
 Sjofartsverket 
 The Swedish Lighthouse Society

Lighthouses completed in 1847
Lighthouses in Sweden
Buildings and structures in Gotland County
1847 establishments in Sweden